Enrico Paolini (born 26 March 1945) was an Italian racing cyclist in the 1970s.

Grand Tour results timeline

References

External links

1945 births
Living people
Italian male cyclists
Italian Giro d'Italia stage winners
Sportspeople from the Province of Pesaro and Urbino
Tour de Suisse stage winners
Cyclists from Marche
People from Pesaro